Lyudmila Ivanovna Gavrilova  is a Soviet and Russian film and stage actress, lecturer of acting Boris Shchukin Theatre Institute, a leading informational and educational channel Nastroyeniye on TV Tsentr channel. Honored Artist of Russia (2007).

Biography 
Lyudmila Ivanovna Gavrilova was born November 17, 1951 in the city of Kaluga and spent her childhood in her hometown, where she later graduated from high school.

In 1973 she graduated from the Boris Shchukin Theatre Institute (Tatyana Kopteva's course). In the same year she joined the troupe of Moscow Satire Theatre under the direction of Valentin Pluchek.

In 1973 she made her debut in the title role in the play Pippi Longstocking directed by Margarita Mikaelyan.

Selected filmography 
 1971   We Have a Factory as Alla
 1974   Northern Rhapsody as Tonya Sevastyanova
 1976   Timur and His Squad as Olga, Zhenya's older sister
 1977  Mimino as endocrinologists symposium organizer
 1988 My Name is Harlequin as Harlequin's mother
 1988 Actress from Gribov  as Galina's sister
 1989   Katala as  Crucian's concubine
 2008 The Ghost as episode
 2008/2009 Glukhar (TV Series)  as Natalya Glukharyova (46 episodes)
 2013 Daddy's Daughters (TV Series) as Svetlana's mother-in-law

References

External links

1951 births
Living people
People from Kaluga
Soviet film actresses
Soviet television actresses
Soviet stage actresses
Russian film actresses
Russian television actresses
Russian stage actresses
Honored Artists of the Russian Federation
20th-century Russian actresses
21st-century Russian actresses